Eddie Komboïgo is a politician from Burkina Faso who is serving as the President of Congress for Democracy and Progress which is the main opposition party in Burkina Faso. He was also the presidential candidate for 2020 Burkinabè general election in which he was in second number and got 15 percent vote.

References 

Living people
Year of birth missing (living people)